Oxnard may refer to:

Places
Oxnard, California, a city in Ventura County, California, USA

Arts, entertainment, and media
Oxnard (album), a 2018 album by Anderson Paak
Oxnard, Hamtaro character